Flandy Limpele (born 9 February 1974) is an Indonesian former badminton player and coach. He competed in four Summer Olympic Games: Atlanta 1996, Sydney 2000, Athens 2004, and Beijing 2008.

Career

Player
A doubles specialist, at various times Limpele has focused on either men's doubles or mixed doubles during his long career in international badminton. His earliest appearances in the final rounds of major events came in mixed doubles in the mid-1990s. However, he first broke through internationally in men's doubles at the 1999 Korea Open with Eng Hian. His subsequent men's doubles titles, most of them with Hian, have included the Denmark (2000), Singapore (2002, 2006), Japan (2002), Bitburger (2002), and German (2003) Opens, and the Copenhagen Masters (2000, 2004). Hian and Limpele briefly represented England from 2001 until 2003. They later returned to represent Indonesia for 2004 Summer Olympics. Flandy and Eng were runners-up at the prestigious All-England Championships in 2002, and bronze medalists at the 2004 Athens Olympics.

After 2004 Limpele gravitated back to mixed doubles. In 2006 he teamed with Vita Marissa to win a number of top tier events including the Singapore, Japan,  French, and Chinese Taipei Opens, as well as the Southeast Asian Games title. They were bronze medalists at the 2007 World Championships in Kuala Lumpur, and won the Badminton Asia Championships together in 2008.

Not an especially powerful hitter, Limpele's strengths have been his racket-work, tactical astuteness, and anticipation.

Coaching
Flandy appointed as Malaysian men's doubles coach in 2020, replacing Paulus Firman.

Participation at Indonesian Team
 5 times at Sudirman Cup (1997, 1999, 2001, 2005, 2007)
 1 time at Thomas Cup (2004)

Personal life 
When he was young, he joined the SGS Bandung badminton club. His parents are Erik Limpele (father) and Nelcy Oroh (mother). His hobby is football. Normally people called him Flandy.

Achievements

Olympic Games
Men's doubles

BWF World Championships 
Mixed doubles

World Cup 
Mixed doubles

Asian Championships 
Men's doubles

Mixed doubles

Southeast Asian Games 
Men's doubles

Mixed doubles

BWF Superseries (2 titles, 1 runner-up) 
The BWF Superseries, launched on 14 December 2006 and implemented in 2007, is a series of elite badminton tournaments, sanctioned by Badminton World Federation (BWF). BWF Superseries has two levels: Superseries and Superseries Premier. A season of Superseries features twelve tournaments around the world, which introduced since 2011, with successful players invited to the Superseries Finals held at the year end.

Mixed doubles

 Superseries tournament

BWF Grand Prix 
The BWF Grand Prix has two levels, the BWF Grand Prix and Grand Prix Gold. It is a series of badminton tournaments sanctioned by the Badminton World Federation (BWF) since 2007. The World Badminton Grand Prix sanctioned by International Badminton Federation (IBF) since 1983.

Men's doubles

Mixed doubles

  BWF Grand Prix Gold tournament
  BWF & IBF Grand Prix tournament

BWF International Challenge/Series/Satellite
Men's doubles

Mixed doubles

 BWF International Challenge tournament
 BWF International Series & Asian Satellite tournament

Performance timeline

Indonesian team 
 Senior level

Individual competitions 
 Senior level

References

External links 
 Flandy Limpele's story, career and achievements (Indonesian)
 

1974 births
Living people
People from Manado
Sportspeople from North Sulawesi
Minahasa people
Indonesian male badminton players
English male badminton players
Badminton players at the 1996 Summer Olympics
Badminton players at the 2000 Summer Olympics
Badminton players at the 2004 Summer Olympics
Badminton players at the 2008 Summer Olympics
Olympic badminton players of Indonesia
Olympic bronze medalists for Indonesia
Olympic medalists in badminton
Medalists at the 2004 Summer Olympics
Competitors at the 1999 Southeast Asian Games
Competitors at the 2007 Southeast Asian Games
Southeast Asian Games gold medalists for Indonesia
Southeast Asian Games silver medalists for Indonesia
Southeast Asian Games medalists in badminton
Badminton coaches
Indonesian Christians
World No. 1 badminton players
20th-century Indonesian people
Indonesian expatriate sportspeople in England
Indonesian expatriate sportspeople in India
Indonesian expatriate sportspeople in Malaysia